Viu (pronounced as view) is a Hong Kong-based over-the-top (OTT) video streaming provider from Viu International Ltd, a PCCW Media Group Company. Operated in a dual-revenue model comprising subscriptions and advertising, Viu delivers content in different genres from Asia's top content providers with local language subtitles, as well as original production series under the Viu Original initiative (similar to original programming from other services like Disney+, Amazon Prime Video and Netflix).

Viu is now available in 16 markets across Asia, Africa and the Middle East including Hong Kong, Singapore, Thailand, Philippines, United Arab Emirates, Bahrain, Egypt, Indonesia, Jordan, Kuwait, Malaysia, Oman, Qatar, Saudi Arabia, Myanmar and South Africa. As of December 2021 annual results, Viu had over 58.6 million monthly active users.

History 
Viu International Ltd launched the Viu OTT video service in Hong Kong on 26 October 2015.

In January 2016, Viu announced its official launch in Singapore.

In March 2016, Viu announced its official launch in India and Malaysia.

In May 2016, Viu launches in Indonesia.

In November 2016, Viu announced its official launch in the Philippines and has achieved four million users and over 218 million video views.

In February 2017, Viu was available in major Middle East countries including Bahrain, Egypt, Jordan, Kuwait, Oman, Qatar, Saudi Arabia and the United Arab Emirates.

In May 2017, Viu announced its official launch in Thailand and has expanded to 15 markets across Asia and the Middle East countries.

In September 2018, Viu announced its official launch in Myanmar.

In March 2019, Viu announced its official launch in South Africa.

In December 2019, Viu announced its suspension of operations in India without providing a date. On 5 November 2021, Viu stopped its services in India.

Content 
Viu offers a wide-range catalogue of movies and TV shows from across Asia, including popular and new titles. First-run TV episodes are available on the platform with advertisements in between, at least 72 hours after broadcast; Paid users can access episodes without advertisements, at least eight hours after broadcast. Several titles are also available separately in localized language audio dub; as of 2022, Filipino (including Cebuano), Indonesian and Thai are the only languages offering dubbed versions of Asian drama titles.

Movie titles available on the platform, mostly from its sister network (now Baogu Movies) or partnered (tvN Movies), require active Premium subscription.

Original programming 
Viu has begun producing their original titles, in which most of their originals was based in Southeast Asia that has already received multiple award recognitions such as Asian Academy Creative Awards and Asian Television Awards. They also produce originals for the Middle East and Africa as well, as well as previously produced their originals for the Indian markets.

Drama

Comedy

Co-production

Exclusive international distribution 
In addition to producing and distributing local titles, several Viu shows have been acquired and co-produced, partly or wholly, by Viu for exclusive first-run release or distribution (under the Viu Original label) in Southeast Asia, the Middle East and South Africa in deals with partners in other regions such as Rakuten Viki, Far EasTone Friday Video, KC Global Media (ONE), among others.

Availability 
Viu OTT video service can be accessed anytime and anywhere via Viu app at App Store for iOS devices and Google Play Store for Android devices across the region, or visit www.viu.com to watch on the web, it also can be accessed through Apple TV devices. Registered Viu free or premium subscriber can download videos and watch offline on mobile devices such as smartphones and tablets, as well as save viewing progress, bookmark programmes and receive notifications on new episodes.

Viu's service is run in premium subscription and ad-supported freemium model. Viu premium subscribers are able to enjoy full 1080p HD quality videos, unlimited download without any ads interruption. Meanwhile, Viu freemium users will continue to have access to platform's huge catalogue of content for free.

See also 
 PCCW
 MOOV
 ViuTV
 Vuclip
 List of streaming media services

Notes

References

External links 

Subscription video on demand services
Streaming media systems
Streaming television
Viu (streaming media)